Eric French (born c. 1915) was an Irish-born motorcycle speedway rider who rode for the Wimbledon Dons and New Cross Rangers in the 1930s and 1940s, and represented England in test matches.

Biography
Born in Ireland, French moved with his parents to England before he was one year old. The family settled in Tadworth, Surrey. He began grasstrack racing in 1935, winning several trophies. While grasstrack racing in 1938 he was spotted by former Wimbledon rider Claude Rye, who arranged for French to try out for the Dons, and he was taken on as a junior. In 1939 he rode in the Wimbledon team at reserve, before his career was interrupted by World War II. 

French worked at an aircraft factory in Weybridge during the war, and did not race again until 1945. After practising at Rye House, he signed for New Cross in 1946. He scored nine points in his first match for New Cross, and established himself as a regular team member during the 1946 season, scoring at an average of 5.10.

French finished runner-up to Alec Statham in the London Riders' Championship in 1949 after a run-off. He appeared in the 1949 film Once a Jolly Swagman, for which the racing scenes were shot at New Cross.

Test career
French rode in the England team in the 1949 test series against Australia, scoring 3 points in the third test at New Cross and 7 points in the fourth test at Harringay. In 1950 he rode in all five test matches, scoring 6, 8, 0, 9, and 5. He was not selected in 1951 but returned for the fourth test at New Cross in 1952, scoring 5 points.

References

British speedway riders
English motorcycle racers
Wimbledon Dons riders
New Cross Rangers riders
Wembley Lions riders
Rayleigh Rockets riders
Poole Pirates riders
1910s births
Possibly living people
Year of birth uncertain